is a Japanese tactical role-playing visual novel developed by Aquaplus, which first released in September 2016 for the PlayStation 3, PlayStation 4 and PlayStation Vita. Utawarerumono: Mask of Truth is the third and final game in the Utawarerumono series.

An English version of Utawarerumono: Mask of Truth was published on May 23, 2017, by Atlus USA in North America and by Deep Silver in Europe together with Utawarerumono: Mask of Deception. An anime adaptation of the game made by White Fox premiered in July 2022.

See also
Utawarerumono
Utawarerumono: Mask of Deception

References

2016 video games
PlayStation Vita games
PlayStation 4 games
PlayStation 3 games
Tactical role-playing video games
Video games developed in Japan
Windows games
Deep Silver games
Aquaplus games